A Guilty Thing Surprised is a novel by British crime-writer Ruth Rendell. It was first published in 1970, and is the 5th entry in her Inspector Wexford series.

1970 British novels
Novels by Ruth Rendell
Hutchinson (publisher) books
Inspector Wexford series